The Madina Mosque is a mosque in the Nizamat Fort Campus in Murshidabad, West Bengal, India. There are two Madina mosques in the fort campus, the old one built by Nawab Siraj ud-Daulah during the 18th century.and the new one by Nawab Mansur Ali Khan in 1847.

The old mosque was a part of the old Nizamat Imambara, built by Nawab Siraj ud-Daulah, which was partially burnt in a fire in 1842 but was completely burnt when it caught fire on 23 December 1846. The old Madina mosque survived the 1846 fire and was left in its place. When  Nawab Mansur Ali Khan built the present Nizamat Imambara in 1847, he built another Madina Mosque inside the new building. So Madina or Madina Mosque refer to both the mosques. Both of them lie parallel to the Hazarduari Palace's south face on the banks of the Bhagirathi River. The old one lies a little south to the new one and on the west of the clock tower and just beside the place where the Bacchawali Tope rests.

History and features

The old mosque constructed by Nawab Siraj ud-Daulah, and soil from Mecca was brought which was mixed with its foundation, so that it could provide an opportunity to the poorer members of the local Muslim community to have an experience of Hajj, one of the five pillars of Islam. Constructed primarily of wood, the old Imambara was damaged by fire in 1842 before being completely destroyed by a second fire in 1846. However the old Madina mosque survived the fire. The old mosque is smaller compared to the one built by Nawab Nasur Alikhan and is single domed.

The present Imambara was constructed  in 1847 under the supervision of Sadeq Ali Khan. Within this Imambara lies the new Madina mosque.

The new mosque is built on a raised platform decorated with ornamental china tiles, and the foundation contains soil from Karbala. It is said that in the past, fountains stood between the Memberdalan and the Madina Mosque, encircling the shrine. The arches and the walls of the mosque are ornamented with texts from the Quran.

Maps

References

External links

Images of Nizamat Imambara on Flickr

Islamic rule in the Indian subcontinent
Indo-Islamic architecture
Mosques in Murshidabad
Tourist attractions in Murshidabad
Religious buildings and structures completed in 1847
19th-century mosques
1847 establishments in British India